Hans Müller (7 March 1931 – 26 August 2021) was a Swiss figure skater. He was the 1955 Swiss national champion. He represented Switzerland at the 1956 Winter Olympics and placed 12th in the men's event.

Competitive highlights

References

External links
 
 List of Historical Swiss Champions

1931 births
2021 deaths
Swiss male single skaters
Olympic figure skaters of Switzerland
Figure skaters at the 1956 Winter Olympics